Maridalia Hernández (born August 19, 1959) is a Dominican singer.

Early life and education
Maridalia Hernández was born in Santiago de los Caballeros, Dominican Republic, in 1959. She was fully trained as a lyrical singer, pianist, cellist and music teacher.

Career
She made her live debut as a pop singer in 1981, while participating in a musical called Sonido Para Una Imagen (Sound for an Image). Later, she was cast to raving reviews as Maria Magdalena in the Spanish version of Jesus Christ Superstar. In 1983, Hernández teamed up with Juan Luis Guerra to assemble the successful bachata-merengue group 440. Her vocal quality identified the sound of the first years of the well known quartet.

In 1986, she won the Viña del Mar International Song Festival with "Para Quererte," composed by Manuel Tejada and José Antonio Rodríguez.

In 1988, she appeared with pianist Michel Camilo at the Festival de Jazz de Madrid and in 1989, she won third place, with the song "Te Ofrezco" in Festival OTI. In 1992, she has also been awarded with the prizes "Aplauso 92" in Miami, Florida and ACE Award 1994, in New York City, New York. In addition to her work with Camilo, she appeared with Cuban Jazz pianist, Gonzalo Rubalcaba on the album "Antiguo" for Blue Note Records.

She currently lives in Santo Domingo and has one daughter, Camila.

Discography
Te Ofrezco (1992)
Amorosa (1993)
Libre (2009)

References 

1959 births
Living people
20th-century Dominican Republic women singers
Dominican Republic people of Spanish descent
Latin music songwriters
Bachata singers
21st-century Dominican Republic women singers
Dominican Republic songwriters
Merengue musicians
Women in Latin music